Jeffrey Eugene Trussler (born 1963) is a United States Navy vice admiral who currently serves as Deputy Chief of Naval Operations for Information Warfare and Director of Naval Intelligence since June 5, 2020. As the DCNO for Information Warfare, Trussler is the principal advisor to the Chief of Naval Operations regarding information, command and control, networks, cybersecurity, intelligence, electronic warfare, battlespace awareness and precision navigation. He previously served as the Director of Future Plans of the United States Navy. Trussler is a member of the Cherokee Nation who was raised in Oklahoma. He graduated from Miami High School (in 1981) and Northeastern Oklahoma A&M Junior College. Trussler earned a B.S. degree in mechanical engineering from Oklahoma State University in 1985 and later received an M.A. degree in managerial economics from the University of Oklahoma in 1992.

References

|-

1963 births
Living people
Place of birth missing (living people)
Cherokee Nation United States military personnel
Oklahoma State University alumni
University of Oklahoma alumni
United States submarine commanders
Recipients of the Legion of Merit
United States Navy admirals
Recipients of the Defense Superior Service Medal
Recipients of the Navy Distinguished Service Medal
20th-century Native Americans
21st-century Native Americans